Madeleine Sharps Buchanan (sometimes spelled Madelaine Sharps Buchanan), nee Madeleine Twining Sharps, was a short story and detective novel writer in the United States. Her story "The Chessboard" was adapted into the 1920 film Dangerous Business starring Constance Talmadge.

She wrote for various magazines including The Continent (magazine), The Argosy, The Black Cat, and County Hand Book on National Distribution.

In 1915, her work was described as small town stories featuring a fictionalized version of where she grew up in Pennsylvania. She was also described as an author of charming characters and a master of detective story writing.

Bibliography
"The Chessboard" (1920)
The Crimson Blade: a detective story (1926)
Powdered Proof (1927)
The Poison Eye, A Detective Story (1928)
Haunted Bells (1929)
The Black Pearl Murders (1930)
The Subway Murder (1930)
The Tempting Virtue (1933)
The Tempting of Tavernake (1933)

Filmography
Dangerous Business (1920 film), adapted from 'The Chessboard"

References

20th-century American novelists
20th-century American short story writers
American women novelists
American women short story writers
Year of birth missing (living people)
20th-century American women writers